This Being Human is an interview podcast hosted by Abdul-Rehman Malik that focuses on Muslim art and culture. The podcast was created by the Aga Khan Museum and produced by Antica Productions.

Background
The Aga Khan Museum is North America's first and only museum dedicated to Muslim cultures and heritage. The name of the podcast is based on one of Rumi's poems called "The Guest House." The host of the podcast, Abdul-Rehman Malik, is a journalist and educator. Malik was born in Thorncliffe Park to Pakistani immigrants. Malik has explored his own religion and spirituality through the act of storytelling throughout his career as a journalist. He has worked at the Toronto Star and the Canadian Broadcasting Corporation. In each episode Malik interviews someone who has been influenced by the religion and culture of Islam.

Episodes

Introductory episode (2021)

Season 1 (2021)

References

External links
 
 

2021 podcast debuts
Audio podcasts
Religion and spirituality podcasts
Arts podcasts
Interview podcasts
Canadian podcasts
Islamic podcasts